The qualifying heats and the finals of the Men's 50 metres Freestyle event at the European LC Championships 1995 were held on Saturday 26 August 1995 in Vienna, Austria.

Finals

Qualifying heats

See also
1995 Men's World Championships (SC) 50m Freestyle
Swimming at the 1996 Summer Olympics - Men's 50 metre freestyle

References
 scmsom results
 swimrankings
 swimmers-world

F